The 1999 Heineken Trophy women's singles was the women's singles event of the tenth edition of the Rosmalen Grass Court Championships, a WTA Tier III tournament held in 's-Hertogenbosch, Netherlands and part of the European grass court season. Julie Halard-Decugis was the defending champion, but she did not compete this year.

Kristina Brandi won in the final, 6–0, 3–6, 6–1, against Silvija Talaja, to win what was her only WTA title.

Seeds

Draw

Finals

Top half

Bottom half

References
 ITF singles results page

Singles
Heineken Trophy - Singles